P133 may refer to:
 
 BRM P133, a Formula One racing car
 P133, a state regional road in Latvia